Skou may be,

Skou language (also known as Sekol, Sekou, Sko, Skouw, Skow, Sukou, or Tumawo (Te Mawo)), is a Papuan language of Indonesia
Skou languages, a small language family spoken by about 7000 people, mainly along the Vanimo coast of Sandaun Province in Papua New Guinea

People
Erik Skou (1917–1984), Danish swimmer 
Jens Christian Skou (1918–2018), Danish biochemist and Nobel laureate
Per Skou (1891–1962), Norwegian footballer, sports official and businessperson
Søren Skou (born 1964), Danish businessman
Sophia Skou (born 1975), Danish swimmer
Tage Skou-Hansen (1925–2015), Danish writer, editor and scholar
Ulla Skou or Ulla Poulsen (1905–2001), formerly Baroness Ulla Rosenørn-Lehn, Danish balerina and actress